The Doris Duke Artist Award is undertaken by the Doris Duke Charitable Foundation and designed to "empower, invest in and celebrate artists by offering multi-year, unrestricted funding as a response to financial and funding challenges both unique to the performing arts and to each grantee". Started in 2011, the program supports artists in jazz, theatre, and contemporary dance.
The Doris Duke Artist Award offers up to $275,000 of individual support ($250,000 in unrestricted funding and up to $25,000 to artists who have demonstrated that they are saving towards later years of their career).  Two classes of Doris Duke Impact Awards totaling $80,000 were made in 2014 and 2015, but the program was discontinued after that.

Eligibility 
Individuals are nominated for the award by nominators who are experts in the fields DDCF funds, as well as by previous Doris Duke Artists, and become eligible for the Award when they have won at least three designated national or regional grants, awards, or accolades.  An anonymous panel reviews all eligible artists and recommends a class of recipients every year.

Recipients 
2021 Arts Award Recipients

 Lileana Blain-Cruz
 Teo Castellanos
 Kris Davis
 Dormeshia
 Cynthia Oliver
 Danilo Pérez
 Wayne Shorter

2020 Artist Award Recipients

 Ana María Alvarez
 Andrew Cyrille
 Sean Dorsey
 Michael John Garcés
 Rennie Harris
 Dael Orlandersmith
 Cécile McLorin Salvant
 Pam Tanowitz

2019 Artist Award Recipients

 Donald Byrd
 Terri Lyne Carrington
 Michelle Ellsworth
 Marcus Gardley
 George E. Lewis
 Lauren Yee

2018 Artist Award Recipients
 Dee Dee Bridgewater
 Regina Carter
 Michelle Dorrance
 Stefon Harris
 Muriel Miguel
 Okwui Okpokwasili
 Rosalba Rolón

2016 Artist Award Recipients
 Kyle Abraham
 Sharon Bridgforth
 Dave Douglas
 Faye Driscoll
 Janie Geiser
 Miguel Gutierrez
 Fred Hersch
 Wayne Horvitz
 Taylor Mac
 Dianne McIntyre
 Jason Moran
 Mark Morris
 Lynn Nottage
 Thaddeus Phillips
 Will Power
 Aparna Ramaswamy
 Matana Roberts
 Jen Shyu
 Wadada Leo Smith
 Morgan Thorson
 Henry Threadgill

2015 Artist Award Recipients

 Muhal Richard Abrams
 Ambrose Akinmusire
 Darcy James Argue
 Camille A. Brown
 Ronald K. Brown
 Ann Carlson
 Nora Chipaumire
 Steve Coleman
 Paul S. Flores
 Cynthia Hopkins
 Daniel Alexander Jones
 Alonzo King
 Okkyung Lee
 Linda Parris-Bailey
 Stephen Petronio
 Mildred Ruiz-Sapp
 Steven Sapp
 Shawn Sides
 Yosvany Terry
 Doug Varone

2015 Impact Award Recipients
Becca Blackwell
 Kris Davis
 Lear deBessonet
 Mark Dresser
 Michelle Ellsworth
 Beth Gill
 Milford Graves
 Ishmael Houston-Jones
 Morgan Jenness
 Heather Kravas
 Dohee Lee
 Dianne McIntyre
 Matt Mitchell
 Carlos Murillo
 Brooke O'Harra
 Susan Rethorst
 Tyshawn Sorey
 Henry Threadgill
 Reggie Workman
 Pamela Z

2014 Artist Award Recipients
 John Collins
 Joanna Haigood
 David Henry Hwang
 John Jasperse
 Emily Johnson
 Bill T. Jones
 Melanie Joseph
 Nancy Keystone
 Lisa Kron
 Oliver Lake
 Steve Lehman
 Tarell Alvin McCraney
 Roscoe Mitchell
 Zeena Parkins
 Annie-B Parson
 Ranee Ramaswamy
 Peggy Shaw
 Craig Taborn
 Randy Weston

2014 Impact Award Recipients
 Muhal Richard Abrams
 Ambrose Akinmusire
 Steve Coleman
 Anna Halprin
 Trajal Harrell
 Julia Jarcho
 Jennifer Lacey
 Jodi Melnick
 Ben Monder
 Jennifer Monson
 Dean Moss
 Lucia Neare
 Aruán Ortiz
 Matana Roberts
 Tina Satter
 Jen Shyu
 Johnny Simons
 Michael Sommers
 Adrienne Truscott
 Cristal Chanelle Truscott

2013 Artist Award Recipients
 Anthony Braxton
 Billy Childs
 Ping Chong
 Kelly Copper
 Lisa D'Amour
 DD Dorvillier
 Amir ElSaffar
 David Gordon
 Pat Graney
 Stacy Klein
 David Lang
 Pavol Liska
 Rudresh Mahanthappa
 John Malpede
 Miya Masaoka
 Myra Melford
 Tere O'Connor
 William Parker
 Elizabeth Streb
 Jawole Willa Jo Zollar

2012 Artist Award Recipients
 Anne Bogart, theatre 
 Don Byron, jazz
 Wally Cardona, dance
 Rinde Eckert, theatre
 Bill Frisell, jazz
 Deborah Hay, dance
 John Hollenbeck, jazz
 Vijay Iyer, jazz
 Marc Bamuthi Joseph, theatre
 Elizabeth LeCompte, theatre
 Young Jean Lee, theatre
 Ralph Lemon, dance
 Richard Maxwell, theatre
 Sarah Michelson, dance
 Bebe Miller, dance
 Nicole Mitchell, jazz
 Meredith Monk, dance
 Eiko Otake, dance
 Takashi Koma Otake, dance
 Basil Twist, theatre
 Reggie Wilson, dance

References 

http://www.ddcf.org/what-we-fund/performing-arts/goal-and-strategies/support-for-artists/unrestricted-support-for-artists/doris-duke-artist-awards/
https://web.archive.org/web/20130312021237/http://ddpaa.org/eligibility/
https://web.archive.org/web/20130325194242/http://www.ddcf.org/Programs/Arts/
http://creative-capital.org/news_items/view/416
https://web.archive.org/web/20120912193237/http://www.playbill.com/news/article/165081-Doris-Duke-Foundation-Announces-Inaugural-Doris-Duke-Artists-Receiving-225000-Grants-Anne-Bogart-Rinde-Eckert-Among-Recipients
https://www.wsj.com/articles/SB10001424052702304299304577349910365901358 
http://www.theatermania.com/new-york-city-theater/news/04-2012/anne-bogart-rinde-eckert-young-jean-lee-basil-twis_55097.html
http://latimesblogs.latimes.com/culturemonster/2011/10/artist-grants-jazz-dance-theater-.html
http://foundationcenter.org/pnd/news/story.jhtml?id=377100011
http://www.giarts.org/blog/steve/doris-duke-charitable-foundation-announces-first-recipients-performing-artists-initiative

Acting awards
American dance awards
American music awards
Awards established in 2011
Performing arts awards